USS Castor is a name used more than once by the U.S. Navy:

 , a single turreted monitor, was named Castor from 15 June to 10 August 1869.
 , a stores ship commissioned 12 March 1941.

United States Navy ship names